After the conquest of Constantinople in 1453, the sultans of the Ottoman Empire laid claim to be the legitimate Roman emperors, in succession to the Byzantine emperors who had previously ruled from Constantinople. Based on the concept of right of conquest, the sultans at times assumed the styles kayser-i Rûm ("Caesar of Rome", one of the titles applied to the Byzantine emperors in earlier Ottoman writings) and basileus (the ruling title of the Byzantine emperors). The assumption of the heritage of the Roman Empire also led the Ottoman sultans to claim to be universal monarchs, the rightful rulers of the entire world.

The early sultans after the conquest of Constantinople–Mehmed II, Bayezid II, Selim I and Suleiman I–staunchly maintained that they were Roman emperors and went to great lengths to legitimize themselves as such. Greek aristocrats, i.e. former Byzantine nobility, were often promoted to senior administrative positions and Constantinople was maintained as the capital, rebuilt and considerably expanded under Ottoman rule. The administration, architecture and court ceremonies of the early post-1453 Ottoman Empire were heavily influenced by the former Byzantine Empire. The Ottoman sultan also used their claim to be Roman emperors to justify campaigns of conquest against Western Europe. Both Mehmed II and Suleiman I dreamt of conquering Italy, which they believed was rightfully theirs due to once having been the Roman heartland.

Although the claim to Roman imperial succession never formally stopped and titles such as kayser-i Rûm and basileus were never formally abandoned, the claim gradually faded away and ceased to be stressed by the sultans. The primary reason for the break with claiming Greco-Roman legitimacy was the increased transformation of the Ottoman Empire to claiming Islamic political legitimacy from the 16th century onwards. This was the result of Ottoman conquests in the Levant, Arabia and North Africa having turned the empire from a multi-religious state to a state with a clear Muslim majority population, which necessitated a claim to legitimate political power rooted in Islamic rather than Roman tradition. The shift in Ottoman identity also resulted from conflict with the Safavid Empire in Iran, which followed Shia Islam, leading to the sultans more strongly embracing and stressing their Sunni Islam faith. Kayser-i Rûm was last used officially in the 18th century and Greek-language documents ceased to refer to the sultan as basileus at the latest in 1876, whereafter the Ottoman rulers were titled in Greek as soultanos and padisach.

Recognition of the Ottoman claim to be Roman emperors was variable, both outside and within the Ottoman Empire. The Ottomans were widely accepted as Romans in the Islamic world, with the sultans being recognized as Roman emperors. The majority of the Christian populace of the Ottoman Empire also recognized the sultans as their new emperors, but views differed among the cultural elite. Some saw the Ottomans as infidels, barbarians and illegitimate tyrants, others saw them as divinely ordained as punishment for the sins of the Byzantine people and others yet accepted them as the new emperors. From at least 1474 onwards, the Ecumenical Patriarchate of Constantinople recognized the sultans by the title basileus. Whereas views were variable in regards to the legitimacy of the Ottomans as sovereigns, they were consistent in that the Ottoman Empire as a state was not seen as the seamless continuation of the Roman Empire, but rather its heir and successor, as the former empire had far too deep theological roots to be compatible with a foreign Muslim ruler. Thus, the former Byzantines saw the Ottoman Empire as inheriting the political legitimacy and right to universal rule of the preceding empire, but not its other theological implications. In Western Europe, where the Byzantine emperors had not been recognized as Roman either, the Ottomans were generally seen as emperors, but not Roman emperors. Views on whether the Ottoman sultans were the successors of the Byzantine emperors or a completely new set of rulers varied among westerners. The right of the Ottoman sultans to style themselves as Roman emperors and claim universal rule was challenged for centuries by the rulers of the Holy Roman Empire and the Russian Empire, both of whom claimed this dignity for themselves. The different emperors sometimes recognized the others as being of equal rank or higher rank, such as the Holy Roman recognition of the Ottoman sultan as superior in the 1533 Treaty of Constantinople and a more equal mutual recognition between the two in the 1606 Peace of Zsitvatorok.

Background

Political context 

The Eastern Roman, or Byzantine, Empire traced its origin as an institution to the foundation of Constantinople as the new capital of the Roman Empire in 330 by Constantine the Great. The Byzantine Empire survived the 5th century, when the Western Roman Empire fell, more or less intact. The Byzantine populace continually maintained that they were Romaioi (Romans), not Hellenes (Greeks), even as the empire's borders gradually became reduced to in the end only encompassing Greek-speaking lands. By the 15th century, the Byzantine emperors ruled a disintegrating and dwindling empire. Over the course of the 14th century, the Ottoman Empire conquered vast swaths of territories and by the beginning of the 15th century, they ruled much of Anatolia, Bulgaria, central Greece, Serbia, Macedonia and Thessaly. The Byzantine Empire, once extending throughout the eastern Mediterranean, was more or less reduced to the imperial capital of Constantinople itself, the Peloponnese and a handful of islands in the Aegean Sea, and was forced to pay tribute to the Ottomans.Under Sultan Mehmed II, the Ottoman Empire conquered Constantinople in 1453, an event generally regarded to have marked the definitive end of the Roman Empire, as well as the final and decisive step in the Ottoman conquest of the former empire's core lands and subjects. 1453 also marked the true birth of the Ottoman Empire, which would come to dominate much of the eastern Mediterranean until its fall in 1922. The conquest of Constantinople had been a dream of Islamic armies since the 8th century and through its possession, Mehmed II and his successors were able to claim to be the heirs of the Roman emperors. Mehmed had great interest in Roman and classical Greek history, a topic he had been taught on extensively by court teachers in his youth. He emulated himself on Julius Caesar and Alexander the Great, at one point visited the city of Troy to see the graves of the mythological Greek heroes Achilles and Ajax, and kept a copy of the Iliad in his personal library.

Rome and Byzantium in Ottoman writings 
The Ottomans equated the title padişah with emperor, but early Ottoman historians primarily used three different terms when discussing the Byzantine emperors: tekfur, fasiliyus and kayser. Tekfur was the most common. The etymology of tekfur is disputed, whereas the majority view is that it is derived from the Armenian taghavor (meaning "crown-bearer") some historians believe that it is ultimately derived from a misspelling of the name Nikephoros (deriving from the Byzantine emperor Nikephoros II Phokas). The term is used in pre-1453 sources to refer to Byzantine government servants of all ranks, from lowly governors and commanders to emperors, and thus had a demeaning connotation, equating the emperors with the lower-ranking officers. Fasiliyus is a transliterated form of the Byzantine basileus, a title reserved only for the Byzantine emperor in Byzantine imperial ideology. Kayser is derived from the ancient Roman name and title Caesar, which depending on the time period had wildly different political implications in the Roman and Byzantine world. Just as the title entered the Slavic world in the form tsar, it entered the Turkish and Persian worlds in the form kayser. Some Ottoman historians, such as Tursun Beg, used the more elaborate kayser-i Rûm ("Caesar of Rome") for the Byzantine emperors. Though recognition of the Byzantine Empire as being the Roman Empire had gradually faded away in Western Europe after the 9th century, Muslims in the Middle Ages continually recognized the Byzantine Empire as the Roman Empire. In early Muslim sources, the term Rūmī is used for Christians in general, but later on it became restricted to just refer to the Byzantines.

History

From Mehmed II to Suleiman I

Titles 

After the Mehmed II's conquest of Constantinople in 1453, the sultans of the Ottoman Empire embraced the legacy and heritage of the Byzantine emperors and began fashioning themselves as their heirs. As claimant Roman emperors, the sultans also viewed themselves as inheriting the Byzantine and Roman claim to universal power. In the immediate aftermath of the conquest, Mehmed proclaimed himself kayser-i Rûm. He was at some point prior to 1474 also recognized as basileus by the Ecumenical Patriarchate of Constantinople. Despite this, Mehmed rarely used either kayser or basileus in his official documents, neither in those written in Greek or those written in other languages. Instead, Mehmed's official titulature followed closely that of his father Murad II. His most commonly used Greek-language title was o megas authentis kai megas amiras soultanos o Mechemetpeis ("great ruler, great emir and sultan Mehmed"). Perhaps the lack of official use of basileus and kayser under Mehmed resulted from a wish to not simply be seen as an imitation of the Byzantine emperors. One title that was used more commonly by Mehmed, with clear Roman connotations, was "ruler of the two seas and the two continents", which referred to his claim to rule both the Black Sea and the Mediterranean, as well as both Europe and Asia. In Turkish, Arabic and Persian, the sultans most commonly used the titles padişah and Sultan.

The early Ottoman sultans after 1453 intended to restore something akin to the Byzantine Empire under themselves. According to Arnold J. Toynbee, Mehmed and his immediate successors could thus be seen as "being as much a regenerator of the Byzantine Empire as its executioner". Under Mehmed's successor Bayezid II, basileus entered official usage. Bayezid, his successor Selim I and Selim's successor Suleiman I all used basileus as their primary title in Greek-language documents. Mehmed's kayser-i Rûm also became an integral part of the Ottoman imperial title. When issuing documents in Serbian, Mehmed II, Bayezid II and Selim I are typically referred to under the title "great and mighty tsar", in this case deriving from their use of kayser. In addition to adopting various titles, the Byzantine-oriented political identity of the early Ottoman sultans after 1453 also manifested itself in an increase in protocols, court ceremonies, architecture and symbols borrowed from Byzantium. Both Selim and Suleiman at times employed the style "Emperor of Constantinople", the title previously commonly used in diplomacy for the Byzantine emperors by Western Europeans. Suleiman sometimes used the extended version "Emperor of Constantinople and Trebizond". In Turkish, "Emperor of Constantinople" was rendered as padişah-i Kostantiniye. The version "Emperor of the Romans", padişah-i Rûm, is also attested as being used by the sultans.

In Latin documents, issued for diplomatic correspondence with rulers in Western Europe, the Ottoman sultans frequently used the Latin title imperator. In a 1489 peace treaty between Bayezid II and Poland, the sultan titled himself as Dei gratia Asia, Grecie etc. Imperator Maximus ("by the grace of God the great emperor of Asia, Greece etc."). In a later 1494 peace, Bayezid referred to himself as Dei gracia Imperator ambarum terrarum, Asiae atque Europae et marium Magnus Sultanus ("by the grace of God the emperor of the two continents, Asia and Europe, and of the [two] seas, the great sultan"). A 1519 peace treaty between Poland and Selim I, written in Italian, titles the sultan as Per la Divina favente clementia Grande Imperator di Constantinopoli, di Asia, Europa, Persia, Soria et Egipto et Arabia et de li mari etc. ("by the grace of God the great emperor of Constantinople, Asia, Europe, Persia, Syria, Egypt and Arabia and the two seas etc.").

Politics and society 

Mehmed and his immediate successors took many steps in order to legitimize their rule as Roman emperors. Among other acts, they designated Constantinople as the capital and promoted many Greek aristocrats to elite government positions. Between 1453 and 1516, the Ottoman grand viziers, the highest government office other than sultan, were of various ethnic and religious origin. The holders of the office during this time period included Zagan Pasha (a formerly Christian renegade) and Mahmud Pasha Angelović (a Serbian aristocrat descended from the Byzantine imperial Angelos dynasty). From 1453 onwards, the Ottomans referred to Constantinople as Istanbul, a name derived from the Greek phrase eis tin polin ("to the city"). Formally and officially, the city's name remained Constantinople however, rendered as Kostantiniyye in Turkish, until 1930, after the fall of the Ottoman Empire. The choice to make Constantinople the capital derived from the imperial history and strategic location of the city. Even after his death, Mehmed continued to insist that he was Roman emperor: in his will he chose the site of his burial to be Constantinople, rather than the older site of burial of Ottoman sultans, Bursa. Mehmed's burial ceremony in 1481 was modelled on that of Constantine the Great. Under the last decades of Byzantine rule, the population of Constantinople had decreased dramatically but under the Ottomans, it increased again due to the efforts of the sultans, populated not only by Turks but by diverse people moved there from across the empire. By the late 16th century, the city's population may have reached as high as 250,000, making it the biggest city in Europe. Constantinople remained multiethnic and multireligious throughout much of Ottoman history, in an age when many other governments in Europe enforced national identities and religious beliefs.

The claim of the Ottoman sultans to be Roman emperors was used to justify expansionism into former Roman lands. In 1480, Mehmed launched an unsuccessful invasion of Italy, the intended first step in a campaign to eventually capture Rome itself. Under Suleiman, the Ottoman claims to Roman legitimacy reached their peak. Writing concerning Suleiman's 1529 siege of Vienna, the contemporary Italian historian Paolo Giovio claimed that Suleiman believed that all of Western Europe was rightfully his since he was the legitimate successor of Constantine the Great. In Suleiman's wars against the powers of Western Europe, a common battle cry was "To Rome! To Rome!". During his attack on the Venetian-held island of Corfu in 1537, Suleiman, like Mehmed before him, also pondered invading mainland Italy to capture Rome. Suleiman arranged parades in Constantinople that were consciously modelled on the triumphs of ancient Rome, and also constructed the Süleymaniye Mosque, intended to equal the splendor of the Hagia Sophia. The contemporary Ottoman jurist Ebussuud Efendi compared Suleiman to both Julius Caesar and the ancient Achaemenid ruler Cyrus the Great, writing that Suleiman was a "Caesar of Caesars" and a "Cyrus of Cyruses", and even going as far as stating that he was a "breaker of Caesars" and "the one who casts dust in the faces of Cyrus and Caesar". In an inscription from Bender, Moldova, Suleiman used the title şeh-i Bagdad ve 'Iraq kayser-i-Rûm Mısra sultanım ("Shah of Baghdad and Iraq, Caesar of Rome and Sultan of Egypt").

Orientation towards Islamic political identity

Changes in titulature and ideology 
The Ottoman political identity as founded on the idea that their empire was the successor or continuation of the Byzantine Empire gradually faded away. As the Ottomans conquered more land in the Levant, Arabia and North Africa in the early 16th century, the Islamic identity of the empire and its rulers was increased as a result of its now majority Muslim population. Conflict and rivalry with the Safavid Empire in Iran, which followed Shia Islam, also led the sultans to more strongly embrace and stress their Sunni Islam faith. As a result of these factors, the 16th century saw a major shift in the collective identity of the Ottoman Empire, from a multi-religious state to a more traditional orthodox Sunni one. Still, a large number of Christians continued to live within the borders of the empire and in international diplomacy, the sultans had to deal with Christian monarchs. This meant that although the sultans became less pragmatic and tolerant, Christian and Greco-Roman ideas of legitimacy could not be dropped completely.

As part of the increasing orientation towards Islamic political identity, the Ottoman court stopped to officially issue documents in scripts other than Arabic in 1525. Though translations of official documents were made and issued by lower officials and governors, as well as for purposes of diplomacy, they no longer carried the tughra (the sultan's signature), which only appeared in Arabic documents. As such, the sultans stopped to officially use titles such as basileus, imperator and tsar themselves, instead only in most cases only using Sultan and/or padişah. Eventually, the Ottoman sultans apparently forgot that foreign titles such as basileus had ever been used by their predecessors officially. At the same time, they continued to deny other monarchs the style of padişah in correspondence, meaning that while the foreign titles themselves were forgotten, their implications were not. Though no longer using basileus themselves, the Ottoman sultans after the reign of Suleiman I at times still maintained that they were Roman emperors. Ahmed I referred to himself in his titles as sahib-kıran-i memalik-i-Rûm ve 'Acem ve 'Arab ("the lord of the fortunate conjunction of the Roman, Persian and Arab kingdoms"). The later Mehmed IV used the style ferman-ferma-yi memalik-i-Rûm ve 'Arab ve 'Acem ("the one who issues orders to the Roman, Arab and Persian kingdoms"). The style kayser or kayser-i Rûm remained in use by the sultans as late as the 18th century.

After 1525, the Greek-language translations of official Ottoman documents by governors and officials continued to style the sultans as basileus. A late such example comes from the historical writings of the Greek poet Kaisarios Dapontes (1713–1784), who in his history of the late 17th century Ottoman Empire, written at the request of the Wallachian prince Constantine Mavrocordatos, calls Mehmed IV basileus. The practice of referring to the sultan as basileus in this fashion came to its decisive end in December 1876, when the Ottoman constitution (Kanun-i esasi) was officially translated into Greek and the terms sultan (Σουλτάνος, soultanos) and padişah (ΠΑΔΙΣΑΧ, padisach) were used consistently, rather than terms like basileus or kaisar (the Greek version of Caesar).

Ottoman sultans resumed using imperator in the 19th century for the purposes of international diplomacy. The use of the term this time no longer reflected the Ottoman sultans viewing themselves as superior over other monarchs and as the only true emperors, but instead reflected their wishes for equal recognition among the other rulers of Europe. By this point, numerous other European monarchs had begun to refer to themselves as emperors, including not only the German and Austrian emperors, but also the rulers of France, Russia and Britain.

Roman identity among Ottoman Turks 

Although western authors from the foundation of the Ottoman Empire referred to the empire as "Turkish" and its inhabitants as "Turks", this was not the identity adopted by the empire itself or its populace. Though early sultans had at times emphasized their descent from the Oghuz Turks when competing with other Anatolian beyliks, the emphasis on Turkish identity by the sultans and their subjects rapidly faded away after they began claiming the inheritance of the Greco-Roman world. "Turk" and "Turkish" became derogatory terms, used by the Ottoman elite for nomadic Turkic peoples and the Turkish-speaking peasants in Anatolia; calling the Muslim inhabitants of Constantinople "Turks" would thus have been regarded as insulting. In the early modern period, many Ottoman Turks, especially those who lived in the cities and were not part of the military or administration, instead commonly self-identified as Romans (Rūmī, رومى), as inhabitants of former Byzantine territory. As applied to Ottoman Turks, Rūmī began to fall out of use at the end of the 17th century, and instead the word increasingly became associated only with the Greek population of the empire, who had continually maintained Roman identity since 1453, a meaning that it still bears in Turkey today.

The term "Ottoman Empire" was never used officially by the Ottoman state internally. It derives from the 19th-century French designation l’Empire Ottoman, which was used in international diplomacy, but there was no corresponding concept within the empire. Different aspects of the state, people and territory were termed Devlet-i Âliyye-i Osmaniye ("the Exalted Ottoman State/Dynasty"), Âl-i Osman ("the Family/Dynasty of Osman"), tebaa ("the subjects/flock") and Memâlik-i Mahrûse ("the Well-Protected Domains"). In earlier centuries, several names used for the Ottoman state reflected its assumption of Roman heritage. In the Ottoman historian Mustafa Ali's 1581 work Nuṣḥatü's-selāṭīn ("counsel for sultans"), several terms are used for the empire, including memalik-i Osmaniye ("Ottoman realms"), âl-i Osman, diyar-i Rûm ("lands of Rome"), memalik-i Rum ("Roman realms"), milket-i Osman ("attributes of Osman") and just Rûm ("Rome").

Contemporary recognition

Recognition by Christian subjects 

In Byzantine imperial ideology, possession of Constantinople was the key legitimizing factor for an emperor, as rulers who did not control the city but claimed the title of emperor was seen as acting unnaturally. Despite the obvious territorial decline of the Byzantine Empire over the course of their history, something the Byzantines were well aware of themselves, the Byzantines at no point believed their empire would come to an end, as it was thought that the Roman Empire was destined to endure until the Second Coming of Christ. As the Ottomans could be seen as having obtained Constantinople through the right of conquest, much of the Christian populace of both Constantinople and the wider Ottoman Empire saw Mehmed II as the legitimate new Roman emperor from 1453 onwards. Acting in this role as emperor, Mehmed appointed a new Patriarch of Constantinople, Gennadios II Scholarios, with all the pomp and ceremony previously associated with the appointment of patriarchs during Byzantine rule. Appointing Gennadios gave Mehmed further legitimacy in the eyes of his Christian subjects, and also gave the Ottoman sultans a certain level of control over the Eastern Orthodox Church. By 1474, the Ecumenical Patriarchate of Constantinople had recognized Mehmed as basileus, as a synodal register from that year applies this title to the sultan. Recognition as basileus is significant since Byzantine historians never applied this term to usurpers or illegitimate rulers, who were instead referred to as "tyrants". Nevertheless, among the late and post-Byzantine historians, only a small minority used the term basileus for the Ottoman sultans while the majority of this small minority consists of such figures as Kritovoulos and George of Trebizond who served the Ottoman Sultan Mehmed II. The few other Greeks who used the term for Ottoman Sultans, such as Laonikos Chalkokondyles, used it in order to criticize the Byzantine emperors themselves.

Despite the assumption of Byzantine heritage and recognition by the patriarchate and the wider populace, Greek historians after the fall of Constantinople rarely applied the term basileus to the Ottoman sultans. Broadly speaking, there are three general views concerning the Ottomans in post-1453 Greek histories. The first view was that the Ottomans were infidels, barbarians and illegitimate tyrants, a view best known from the writings of Doukas and Bessarion, Byzantine refugees who had fled to Catholic lands and hoped to inspire an anti-Ottoman crusade. The second view, promoted by the Ecumenical Patriarchate, did not deny that Ottoman rule was illegitimate or tyrannical, but promoted the idea that the sultans were divinely ordained in order to punish the sins of the Byzantine populace and that they thus had to be tolerated. In essence, this theological explanation for Ottoman rule painted the sultans as sent by God to safequard the people of the empire against the attempts by the Palaiologos emperors to reunify the Eastern Orthodox Church with the Catholic Church. The third and least widespread view among historians was an acceptance of state of affairs, viewing the Ottoman sultans as legitimate rulers and in some cases going as far as to refer to them as basileus. In most cases, the historians who express this view are those who either directly served or were associated with the Ottoman regime. Among the historians who served the Ottoman regime were figures such as George of Trebizond and Michael Critobulus, both of whom used basileus for the sultans. Also among those who called the sultan basileus were those historians who were critical of the late Palaiologos emperors, such as Laonikos Chalkokondyles. George of Trebizond wrote eulogies for Mehmed upon the latter's death in 1481, wherein the sultan is called autokrator and basileus basileon (emperor of emperors). In the mind of George of Trebizond, it was the possession of Constantinople that made Mehmed the legitimate Roman emperor: "no one can doubt that he is emperor of the Romans. He who holds the seat of empire in his hand is emperor of right; and Constantinople is the centre of the Roman Empire". Chalkondyles is inconsistent in whether the sultan is called simply basileus or "basileus of the Turks". Perhaps basileus without qualifiers was meant to imply universal power. George Amiroutzes, another historian who served Mehmed, described the sultan in his writings as "basileus of the Greeks and Romans".

Acknowledging  Ottoman rule, per the second and third views, was not simply opportunistic. The fall of Constantinople had contributed to widespread pessimism among the Greek populace and unlike the fall of the city to the Fourth Crusade in 1204, there was no possibility for the empire to be kept alive in exile, nor for it to be restored in the near future. Though the Ottoman Empire, as a result of the assumption of the heritage of the preceding Byzantine Empire, was not regarded as a completely new state by the Christian populace but it was also impossible to view it as the seamless continuation of the Byzantine Empire. In the minds of the Christians, the former empire had far too deep theological roots to be compatible with a foreign Muslim ruler. The Ottoman Empire was instead often seen as the Byzantine Empire's successor and heir, through the concept of translatio imperii, inheriting its political legitimacy and its right to universal rule, but not its other theological implications.

The Ottoman dynasty claimed Byzantine ancestry from at least the 16th century onwards, claiming that Ertuğrul, the father of the dynasty's founder Osman I, was the son of Suleyman Shah, who was in turn supposedly the son of John Tzelepes Komnenos, a renegade prince of the Komnenos dynasty and a grandson of Emperor Alexios I. Due to the chronological distance between some of the supposed ancestors, this particular line of descent is unlikely and the supposed Komnenos ancestry was probably created as a legitimizing device in regards to the many Orthodox Christians the Muslim Ottomans ruled. Some of the Christian subjects of the Ottoman Empire accepted the claim of Komnenos descent. Among contemporary historians, it was advanced by the Greek Theodore Spandounes in the 16th century, and by the Wallachian chronicler Radu Popescu in the 18th century. In this way, a handful of Christian Ottoman subjects saw the Ottomans not as foreign conquerors, but Byzantine imperial descendants with a rightful claim to the empire.

Recognition internationally 

The Ottomans were widely recognized as "Romans" in the Islamic world. In the 16th to 18th centuries, Ottoman administrators sent to govern Egyptian and Arabian territories are almost always referred to by contemporary Arab writers as Arwam (Romans). The emperors of the Mughal Empire recognized the Ottomans as Roman emperors; several Mughal documents refer to the Ottoman sultans as Qaiser-i-Rum, Sultan-i-Rum ("Sultan of Rome") or Khawandkar-i-Rum ("Lord of Rome"). A handful of sources from outside the Islamic world also connected the Ottomans with the Romans. 16th-century Portuguese sources refer to the Ottomans they battled in the Indian Ocean as "rumes" and the Chinese Ming dynasty referred to the Ottomans as Lumi (魯迷), a transliteration of Rūmī, and to Constantinople as Lumi cheng (魯迷城, "Lumi city", i.e. "Roman city").

It appears that Western Europeans recognized the Ottoman sultans as emperors, but not as Roman emperors, the same approach they had to the preceding Byzantine emperors. Whether the Ottomans were seen as legitimate successors of the Byzantine emperors varied. Some writers recognized the sultans in this way: the 15th-century Italian antiquarian Cyriacus of Ancona, for instance, saw Mehmed II as the new emperor in Constantinople, and recognized him as inheriting the imperial legacy of the Byzantine emperors. The claim of the Ottomans to be Roman emperors was challenged by the rulers of the Holy Roman Empire, who had long maintained (in opposition to the Byzantine emperors) that this dignity belonged to them, as well as the Russian emperors, who saw Moscow, by virtue of being the strongest remaining seat of the Eastern Orthodox Church, as the Third Rome, in succession to Rome and Constantinople. Despite being Christian and possessing considerable prejudice against the Turks, there does not appear to have been widespread support for either claim among the populace of other states in Western Europe. In 16th and 17th-century Polish sources, discussing the long rivalry between the Holy Roman emperors and the Ottoman sultans, the political language only refers to both as foreign rulers, both are considered emperors but neither is seen as "Roman": the Holy Roman emperors are referred to as "Christian emperors" and the sultans are called "Turkish emperors".

As part of their claim to be emperors and their claim to universal rule, the Ottoman sultans regarded few foreign monarchs as their equals. The Holy Roman emperors were seen as "kings of Vienna" rather than emperors. Due to longstanding diplomatic relations and several alliances against the Habsburgs, the only foreign rulers the Ottomans recognized as padişah were the kings of France, who did not themselves claim to be emperors. Requests from other monarchs to be treated as equals were ignored or outright rejected. The 1533 Treaty of Constantinople between Sultan Suleiman I and Holy Roman Emperor Charles V explicitly forbade any of its signatories to refer anyone but the Ottoman sultan as emperor. After this treaty, Suleiman viewed himself as formally having wrestled the title of Roman emperor from his rival. After the inconclusive Long Turkish War in 1606, Sultan Ahmed I was forced to be slightly more generous than his predecessor in the titles applied to Holy Roman Emperor Rudolf II in the Peace of Zsitvatorok. Rudolf would not accept the title of "King" but Ahmed would not concede the style kayser or padişah. The compromise devised by the Ottomans was to recognize Rudolf as imperator, interpreted by the Habsburg Monarchy as a great symbolic victory. It is unlikely that Ahmed himself viewed this as recognition that Rudolf held equal status to him, given that the Ottomans by this point had disassociated themselves from the style of imperator and would not have seen its attribution to a ruler viewed as inferior and an infidel as something hurting Ahmed's dignity. Ahmed also kept the titles kayser or padişah solely for himself.

References

Bibliography 

History of the Ottoman Empire
Mehmed the Conqueror
Fall of the Byzantine Empire